The following lists events that happened during 1979 in Cape Verde.

Incumbents
President: Aristides Pereira
Prime Minister: Pedro Pires

Events
Cape Verde ratified the UN treaties of the International Convention on the Elimination of All Forms of Racial Discrimination and the International Convention on the Suppression and Punishment of the Crime of Apartheid
June 28: Escola de Formação de Professores (EFPES), Cape Verde's first college established, it is now part of the University of Cape Verde

Births
Yara dos Santos, singer
January 14: Dário Furtado, footballer
November 30: Janício Martins, footballer

References

 
Years of the 20th century in Cape Verde
1970s in Cape Verde
Cape Verde
Cape Verde